Mohanlalganj is a Lok Sabha parliamentary constituency in Lucknow district, Uttar Pradesh.

Assembly segments
Presently, Mohanlalganj Lok Sabha constituency comprises five Vidhan Sabha (legislative assembly) segments. These are:

Members of Parliament

Election results

General election 1962

General election 1967

General election 1971

General election 1977

General election 1980

General election 1984

General election 2009

General election 2014

General election 2019

References

See also
 List of Constituencies of the Lok Sabha
 Sitapur district

Lok Sabha constituencies in Uttar Pradesh
Politics of Sitapur district